The Korymbos (both meaning "cluster" or "uppermost points") was a jewel-studded globe containing the top hair of the ruler of the Sasanian dynasty of Iran, resting on his crown. It was introduced by Ardashir I. The art historian Matthew P. Canepa notes that although the Greek word Korymbos or Latin Corymbus has become a scholarly convention to refer to the spherical shape on the top of Sasanian crowns, it is not an indigenous Iranian term.

References

Sources 

Iranian clothing
Ardashir I
Sasanian Empire
Greek words and phrases
Headgear